Operation Karbala-2 (Persian: عملیات کربلای 2) was an Iranian operation during Iran–Iraq War which was launched on 1 September 1986 in Haji Omeran area in Iraq with the command/participation of a brigade from Seyyed-al-Shohada corp-4 (of Islamic Revolutionary Guard Corps). As a result of the operation which was commenced by the code of "Ya Aba Abdellah al-Hussain (a.s.)", a part of "Haj-Omeran" road and some altitudes became occupied by Iranian forces. 

At the operation Karbala-2 which was almost near the end of the 4th year of the war, there were other (Iranian) corps which participated in the operation in addition to  Seyyed-al-Shohada corp-4, including:

Badr brigade-9, Qaem-12, Imam Reza-21, Quds-105 and Shuhada-155; which was done totally by the participation of 28 battalions from Islamic Revolutionary Guard Corps.

Iran claimed that, at the end of this operation, Iranian forces captured the altitudes of "1600, 1700, 1800, 2000, 2200, 2435" and also a part of "Haj-Omran-Darbande Chuman Mostafa" and "GardKu" road in Iraq.

See also 
 Operation Karbala-1
 Operation Karbala-4
 Operation Karbala-5
 Operation Karbala-6
 Operation Karbala-7
 Operation Karbala-10

References 

Operations Karbala
Battles involving Iran
Battles involving Iraq
1986 in Iraq
September 1986 events in Asia
Military operations of the Iran–Iraq War in 1986